The Insurgency in Idlib is an ongoing insurgency in rebel-held areas in the Idlib Governorate between multiple factions ranging from supporters of the Syrian government to Syrian opposition elements to supporters and members of the Islamic State of Iraq and the Levant (ISIL). The insurgency has been marked by assassinations and bombings, as well as armed confrontations with small arms and raids.

Timeline

2016
On 31 March 2016, the Army of Conquest coalition claimed to have captured members of a cell belonging to Jaysh al-Thuwar, an Arab component of the Syrian Democratic Forces (SDF) in Idlib that was  reportedly conducting assassinations and kidnappings in the area.

On 4 October 2016, Ahrar al-Sham arrested an alleged ISIL cell affiliated with Jund al-Aqsa; Jund al-Aqsa later retaliated by arresting some Ahrar al-Sham members, allegedly beating the wife and shooting the brother of one member in the process. Two days later, on 6 October, Ahrar al-Sham gave an ultimatum to Jund al-Aqsa to release the captured members; Jund al-Aqsa countered by asking that Ahrar al-Sham release the captive Jund al-Aqsa members that were alleged to be a part of ISIL.

2017
On 16 June 2017, a suicide bomber attempted to assassinate Saudi cleric Abdullah al-Muhaysini, whom at the time was serving on Hayat Tahrir al-Sham (HTS)'s Sharia component, after leaving a mosque in Idlib. In an online video after the attack, Muhaysini said he was uninjured and explained that an individual had approached his car wearing an explosive belt and blew themselves up.

On 24 July 2017, during fighting between Ahrar al-Sham and Hayat Tahrir al-Sham, car bombs were detonated in Idlib reportedly killing 50 HTS members; the car bombs reportedly belonged to Ahrar al-Sham.

2018
In February 2018, Hayat Tahrir al-Sham accused the Nour al-Din al-Zenki Movement of planting IEDs and assassinating HTS members in Idlib, later leading to an armed conflict between the two.

On 26 April 2018, Abu al-Ward Kafer Batikh an HTS commander and his bodyguards were killed in Ma'arrat al-Nu'man, on the same day Abu Salim Binnish, a Syrian Liberation Front (SLF) commander was also killed by gunmen in Binnish.

On 28 April, a Free Syrian Police commander was killed by an IED in northern Idlib. Hours later pro-opposition activists reported that two members of Jaysh al-Izza were killed by unidentified gunmen in Khan Shaykhun while a commander belonging to Jaysh al-Ahrar was also killed on the same day. In response, an HTS security official accused Ahrar al-Sham of carrying out the assassinations.

In May 2018, HTS claimed to have detained members of an all-female assassination cell in Idlib that were loyal to the Syrian government and were recruited by Russia.

On 18 June 2018, Jaysh al-Ahrar's deputy commander was killed by gunmen in Saraqib after praying at a mosque. The group released a statement saying the assassins were unknown individuals.

On 22 June, a senior HTS leader named Abu Khadija Bilal al-Khuraisat was killed by gunmen in Tarmala. On the same day Jaysh al-Ahrar and the Sham Legion arrested the leader of ISIL's Idlib Province.

On 29 July, three SLF members were killed in Ma'arrat al-Nu'man; the group said the assassination was carried out by spies belonging to the Syrian government.

2019
In January 2019, an ISIL-linked media group called the Muhajireen Foundation, which provides reports on events that effect displaced ISIL fighters in Syria, released a statement warning displaced ISIL fighters in Idlib to avoid gatherings because of crackdowns by HTS and Al-Qaeda's Syrian branch the Guardians of Religion Organization.

On 18 January 2019, a car bomb exploded at an HTS checkpoint in Idlib, reportedly resulting in the death of 10 HTS militants; on the same day, gunmen wounded three HTS fighters and a commander belonging to Jaysh al-Izza was killed after a bomb placed in his car by an unknown group detonated.

On 29 January, a female suicide bomber HTS believed to be affiliated with ISIL attacked the headquarters of the Syrian Salvation Government; after fighting the guards outside, she blew herself up, wounding a number of people. ISIL's Amaq News Agency later denied they were involved with the attack.

In March 2019, HTS executed several ISIL members believed to be behind drive-by shootings, assassinations, and bombings in Idlib city. HTS reportedly installed security cameras around the city to monitor the area.

On 5 March 2019, HTS raided an ISIL compound in Atarib and captured an ISIL commander as well as several stockpiles of small arms, munitions, as well as bomb making materials and explosives already manufactured by ISIL.

On 14 March, several ISIL members were able to escape from an HTS prison, reportedly after a series of Russian airstrikes in the area.

In August 2019, the ISIL-linked Muhajireen Foundation published an infographic showing three separate HTS activities against ISIL in Idlib. The infographic announced that several individuals held by HTS were executed publicly for allegedly belonging to ISIL and carrying out bombings. The report also included a report that two individuals were arrested in Nayrab for planting IEDs on behalf of ISIL. The report also stated that HTS raided the military headquarters of the Guardians of Religion Organization and its ally Ansar al-Tawhid, which is made up of former Jund al-Aqsa elements, in a town near Jisr al-Shughur, and arrested two Egyptians from both groups for having ties to ISIL.

On 5 August, a Tunisian Guardians of Religion Organization commander was assassinated by unknown perpetrators in Taftanaz, with some pro-opposition activists claiming the assassins were ISIL-linked.

2020
On 18 March 2020, as part of a ceasefire arrangement following a Syrian government offensive in Idlib, Turkish troops entered the de-escalation zone to reopen the M4 highway previously blocked by HTS and other jihadist factions. On the same day, an Ahrar al-Sham commander was killed after a roadside bomb went off while he was driving near Jisr al-Shughur.

On 19 March, two Turkish soldiers were killed and a third was wounded by an attack that the Turkish Defense Ministry claimed was carried out by unnamed radical groups. The Guardians of Religion Organization was accused of carrying out the attack.
 
On 24 March, a mine detonated while a Turkish military convoy was passing through the town of Sufahan in southern Idlib on the M4 highway resulting in two Turkish soldiers wounded. On the same day unknown gunmen tried to kidnap a rebel commander of Jabhat Thuwar Saraqib in Idlib city, wounding him by gunshot.

On 30 March, a judge affiliated with Hayat Tahrir al-Sham was killed, along with another individual with him in an IED attack in Idlib.

On 4 April, an Ahrar al-Sham field commander was killed by a mine in Sufahan.

On 13 April, protestors demonstrating against Turkish forces patrolling the M4 highway, as part of a cease-fire agreement with Russia, were broken up by Turkish military personnel. In response fighters from Hayat Tahrir al-Sham, which was supporting the protests opened fire on the Turkish military. After the incident the HTS fighters involved in the shootings were reprimanded by their command. This has been the first reported incident of aggressive actions between HTS and Turkish forces in Syria, however HTS has reportedly stopped Russian patrols and acted aggressively towards them since the implementation of the agreement, between Turkey and Russia regarding Idlib. On the same day, following the incident between HTS and the Turkish military, HTS arrested a commander from Faylaq al-Sham,  a Turkish-backed rebel group, HTS also arrested members of the National Front for Liberation which Faylaq al-Sham belongs to, the National Front for Liberation members were reportedly heading to front lines in Saraqib when they were arrested at an HTS checkpoint, at a checkpoint in the town of Neyrab near Saraqib.

On 16 April, an unknown aircraft attacked a jihadist vehicle killing three rebels from Jaish al-Nasr in the al-Ghaab plain. The aircraft was supposedly a Russian drone according to Al Masdar News and the Syrian Observatory for Human Rights.

On 19 April, Hayat Tahrir al-Sham attacked the headquarters of the Guardians of Religion Organization and attempted to force the group to withdraw from the town of Armanaz, following the decision of HTS to reopen trade crossings to government held areas, which was opposed by locals and the Guardians of Religion Organization. Following the incident the Guardians of Religion Organization released a statement calling HTS reckless and called on HTS to redirect its attention to fighting the Syrian government instead.

On 26 April, Turkish forces demolished tents set by protestors during a "sit in" in Al-Karama. Protesters, including Hayat Tahrir al-Sham rebels opposed the agreement made between Turkey and Russia regarding the reopening of the M4 Highway. After clashes that left four killed including HTS members, jihadist forces attacked a Turkish outpost, leaving several Turkish soldiers wounded which were evacuated by helicopter to Turkey.
 Turkish drones were reported targeting a car belonging to the HTS killing two fighters and leaving three wounded.

On 8 May, Syrian government forces captured two members of Jaysh al-Ahrar in Idlib near the border between Syrian government-held territory and countryside frontlines with the rebels.

On 21 May, an HTS leader was targeted by an Improvised explosive device planted below his vehicle, killing him instantly.

On 27 May, the Turkish Ministry of Defense announced the death of a Turkish soldier by an explosion in the Aleppo-Latakia Highway in northwestern Idlib. A convoy of Turkish military vehicles and opposition factions was targeted by an IED, Turkish helicopters evacuated the wounded to Al-Rayhaniyyah.

On 29 May, Hayat Tahrir al-Sham raided the house of a former Jund al-Aqsa commander and killed him in front of his family, then disposed his body in an unknown location. On the same day a Christian civilian was kidnapped in Al-Ya’qubiya for unknown reasons by unidentified persons.

On 5 June, an attack on a Turkish Army Ambulance left two Turkish soldiers were killed, on the Idlib-Sarmin Highway in Idlib Governorate.

On 14 June, a drone targeted a vehicle killing two jihadist leaders, one Jordanian and one Yemeni national, both were leaders Al-Qaeda affiliated group, Guardians of Religion Organization. The Syrian Observatory for Human Rights hinted that the attacking drone could be an American UAV.

On 15 June, unknown assailants targeted and killed a leader of 'Jaysh Al-Suqur' a Turkish-backed rebel group on Idlib part of the National Liberation Front. Another rebel leader was injured in the attack.

On 26 June, fighting between HTS and Hurras al Din took place in Kafr Rohin and Ma’artin left 19 fighters killed in Idlib, 12 from Guardians of Religion Organization and 7 from HTS.

On 18 August two US MQ-9 Reapers combat drones were lost over Idlib, Syria. According to US officials both drones collided and crashed. However video images show one of the drones already on fire before crashing and an explosion in the air will hint that at least one of the drones was shot down by Turkish-backed rebels or Turkish forces.

On 6 September, unknown assailants targeted a Turkish military base in the town of Ma’atram near Idlib city. The attack resulted in two Turkish soldiers wounded, however one of them died by wounds.

On 13 and 14 September, International Coalition combat drones targeted and killed two leaders of “Guardians of Religion Organization”; killed were a Tunisian national in Al-Qusoor neighbourhood of Idlib city and an Uzbek jihadist leader Abu Yehia of Guardians of Religion Organization.

On 20 September Syrian and Russia aircraft targeted Jihadist positions of HTS and “Guardians of Religion Organization” group in Idlib Governorate. During the attack, a command center was destroyed.

On 22 October, US-led coalition drones targeted a meeting in Salqin Province Idlib, the meeting was arranged by a ex-ISIS member with the participation of Guardians of Religion Organization members. At least 23 persons were killed including;17 jihadists and 6 civilians.

On 26 October, Russian aircraft bombed a training camp of Sham Legion, a Turkish-backed rebel group, near Kafr Takharim in Idlib Governorate. The strike killed 78 fighters and wounded more than 100. The head of the Syrian Observatory for Human Rights called the strike the heaviest attack since the beginning of the ceasefire.

On 1 November, fighters of Hayyaat Tahrir Al-Sham besieged and stormed the headquarters of Ahrar al-Sham in Jabal Al-Zawiyah, Idlib.

On 7 November, seven Jihadists from Uzbekistan affiliated to Hayyaat Tahrir Al-Sham were killed by a loitering munitions drone strike in Jabal Al-Zawiyah. The attack was carried out by pro-government forces. Syrian Air Forces backed by Russian Jet fighters targeted rebel forces at 6 locations in Idlib including, command centers and arms depots used by Hayaat Tahrir Al-Sham, leaving 30 rebels killed.

2021
On 3 February, a Turkish soldier died of wounds sustained in an attack on 31 January by unnamed gunmen.

On 29 April, fighting between Syrian Army and rebel forces in Idlib left one Syrian government officer killed.

On 11 May, the Turkish Ministry of Defense announced the death of a soldier and the wounding of four others as a result of rocket fire by unknown attackers on Idlib.

On 20 September, two Jihadist commanders with ties to Al-Qaeda are killed by a US-led coalition drone strike in Idlib region. The vehicle was targeted on the road leading from Idlib city to Binnish.

On 3 October, SOHR reported an explosion in an ammunition warehouse in Wadi al-Naseem neighbourhood in Idlib city, which killed a member of the Turkistan Islamic Party and injured four others while Russian jets continue bombing areas belonging to the  “de-escalation zone”.

See also
SDF insurgency in Northern Aleppo
Eastern Syria insurgency
Second Northern Syria Buffer Zone
Daraa insurgency

References

Idlib Governorate in the Syrian civil war